Mark James Duffy (born 7 October 1985) is an English professional footballer who plays as an attacking midfielder or right winger for  club Macclesfield.

Duffy began his career with the academies at Liverpool and Wrexham before joining non-league side Vauxhall Motors. From there he went to Prescot Cables and Southport and entered the Football League with Morecambe. He joined Scunthorpe United in January 2011, where he spent two-and-a-half years at Glanford Park and the 2013–14 season at Doncaster Rovers.

Duffy moved to Birmingham City in June 2014 but failed to establish himself in the side and was loaned out to Chesterfield and Burton Albion with whom he helped win promotion to the Championship. Duffy signed for Sheffield United in June 2016 and under the management of Chris Wilder the Blades won promotion from League One in 2016–17 and the Championship in 2018–19. In August 2019 Duffy joined Stoke City on loan for the first half of the 2019–20 season and then Dutch side ADO Den Haag in January 2020.

Career

Early life and career
Born in Liverpool, Duffy played for the youth teams of both home-town club Liverpool (from the age of 7 to 16) and Welsh club Wrexham. Duffy began his senior career playing non-League football for Vauxhall Motors, where he made nine appearances (six in the league), scoring once against Woodley Sports in the Cheshire Senior Cup. He later joined Prescot Cables. Duffy stated that, early in his career, he lost his love of football and began working as a scaffolder and as a sports coach for the council. Duffy moved to Conference National side Southport from Prescot Cables in February 2007. The Sandgrounders were relegated to the Conference North at the end of the 2006–07 season. Duffy remained at Haig Avenue for the 2007–08 season and mid-way through 2008–09 he was in talks to join Football League side Morecambe.

Morecambe
Duffy signed for League Two club Morecambe on loan in February 2009. He scored his first goal Football League goal on 18 April 2009 in a 1–0 win against Notts County. He made the move to Globe Arena permanent in the summer and scored six goals in 41 games as the Shrimps reached the League Two play-offs where they lost 7–2 on aggregate to Dagenham & Redbridge. Duffy began the 2010–11 season in good form and manager Sammy McIlroy stated that he can go on to play at a higher level.

Scunthorpe United
Duffy moved to Championship side Scunthorpe United on 20 January 2011 for an undisclosed fee, signing a two-and-a-half-year contract. He made his debut two days later, in a 0–0 draw at home to Burnley. Duffy played 22 times for Scunthopre in 2010–11 as the Iron suffered relegation to League One. He made 43 appearances in 2011–12 helping Scunthopre avoid a second consecutive relegation. However relegation to League Two was suffered in 2012–13 despite a final day victory against Swindon Town. Following relegation Scunthopre received several bids for Duffy from Doncaster Rovers.

Doncaster Rovers
Duffy moved to Doncaster Rovers in July 2013 for an undisclosed fee. Duffy scored twice in 39 appearances in 2013–14 as Doncaster were relegated to League One on goal difference.

Birmingham City
Duffy signed a two-year contract with Birmingham City in June 2014 after activating his relegation release clause at Doncaster Rovers. He made his debut as a second-half substitute in the opening-day defeat at Middlesbrough, and his first League start for the club on 27 September, in a 2–1 home defeat to Fulham; Duffy was substituted at half-time, at which point Birmingham were leading. After appearing only once more in the league by the end of January 2015, he spent a month on loan to League One club Chesterfield, where he made one start and two substitute appearances.

Loan to Burton Albion
Before the start of the 2015–16 season, Duffy joined Burton Albion, newly promoted to League One, on loan until 2 January 2016. In pre-season, Burton manager Jimmy-Floyd Hasselbaink used him in a playmaker role, and he began the league season as a regular selection in the starting eleven. In the opening match, Scunthorpe goalkeeper Luke Daniels was sent off for elbowing Duffy in the head; the resulting penalty gave Burton a 2–1 win.

After the initial loan period expired, it was extended to the end of the season. Duffy completed the season having missed only one league match, against Walsall in February after twisting his ankle in training. He scored eight goals and provided numerous assists as Burton were promoted to the Championship as League One runners-up. His performances earned him selection in the PFA League One Team of the Year.

Sheffield United
Duffy was released by Birmingham at the end of the season, and signed a two-year contract with League One club Sheffield United. Duffy won promotion from League One for a second successive year in 2017, and was also named in the PFA Team of the Year for a second time. Duffy was converted to an attacking midfield role under the management of Chris Wilder as the Blades had a solid return to the Championship finishing in 10th place. He signed a new contract with Sheffield United in January 2018. Duffy scored six goals in 38 matches in 2018–19 as Sheffield United had a very successful campaign finishing as runners-up and were promoted to the Premier League. However, in pre-season Duffy's request for a new contract was turned down by Wilder who made him available for a move away from Bramall Lane.

Loan to Stoke City
On 8 August 2019, Duffy joined Stoke City on loan for the 2019–20 season. Duffy struggled for game time at Stoke making just nine appearances under Nathan Jones and didn't feature at all under Michael O'Neill.

Loan at ADO Den Haag
On 31 January 2020 Duffy's loan at Stoke was cut short and he moved on a six-month loan to Dutch side ADO Den Haag.

He was released by Sheffield United at the end of the 2019–20 season.

Fleetwood Town
On 4 September 2020 he signed a one-year contract with Fleetwood Town. He scored his first goal for Fleetwood in an EFL Cup tie against Everton on 23 September 2020.

At the end of the 2020–21 season, he was released by Fleetwood Town.

Tranmere Rovers
On 31 August 2021, Duffy joined League Two club Tranmere Rovers on a short-term deal until January 2022.

Macclesfield
On 7 January 2022, Duffy signed for North West Counties League Premier Division side Macclesfield.

Career statistics

Honours
Southport
Lancashire Junior Cup: 2007–08

Burton Albion
Football League One runner-up: 2015–16

Sheffield United
EFL League One: 2016–17
EFL Championship runner-up: 2018–19

Individual
PFA Team of the Year: 2015–16 League One, 2016–17 League One

References

1985 births
Living people
Footballers from Liverpool
English footballers
Association football wingers
Liverpool F.C. players
Wrexham A.F.C. players
Vauxhall Motors F.C. players
Prescot Cables F.C. players
Southport F.C. players
Morecambe F.C. players
Scunthorpe United F.C. players
Doncaster Rovers F.C. players
Birmingham City F.C. players
Chesterfield F.C. players
Burton Albion F.C. players
Sheffield United F.C. players
Stoke City F.C. players
ADO Den Haag players
Fleetwood Town F.C. players
Tranmere Rovers F.C. players
Macclesfield F.C. players
National League (English football) players
English Football League players
Eredivisie players
English expatriate footballers
English expatriates in the Netherlands
Expatriate footballers in the Netherlands